Arthur Wallis (16 September 1887 – 21 November 1971) was a British wrestler. He competed in the men's freestyle middleweight at the 1908 Summer Olympics.

References

External links
 

1887 births
1971 deaths
British male sport wrestlers
Olympic wrestlers of Great Britain
Wrestlers at the 1908 Summer Olympics
Place of birth missing